Martha Batalha is a Brazilian writer and journalist.

Born in Recife, Batalha was raised in Rio de Janeiro She studied Journalism at the Pontifical Catholic University of Rio de Janeiro, has a master's degree in Brazilian Literature for the same university and one in Publishing by the New York University, having received the Oscar Dystel fellowship in 2009.

Batalha wrote for the newspapers O Dia, O Globo and Extra. In 2013 she founded the publishing house  Desiderata, which was sold to Ediouro publishing group in 2008.

Her first novel, A Vida Invisível de Eurídice Gusmão (The Invisible Life of Eurídice Gusmão) was rejected by several Brazilian publishers before its rights were first sold to German publishing house Suhrkamp. The book was eventually published in her birth country by Companhia das Letras in 2016 and was adapted into the 2019 film Invisible Life, directed by Karim Aïnouz.

Batalha currently lives in Santa Monica, California, with her husband and children.

Works
2016- The Invisible Life of Eurídice Gusmão (A vida invisível de Eurídice Gusmão) .
2018- Nunca houve um castelo.

References

External links
Official page

Living people
1974 births
21st-century Brazilian women writers
Brazilian journalists
People from Recife
Pontifical Catholic University of Rio de Janeiro alumni
Brazilian women novelists
21st-century Brazilian novelists